Roland "Rollie the Goalie" Joseph Melanson (born June 28, 1960) is a Canadian ice hockey coach and former goaltender in the National Hockey League (NHL). He most recently served as the goaltending coach for the New Jersey Devils, previously serving as assistant coach for the Montreal Canadiens and as goaltending coach for the Vancouver Canucks.

While playing for the Indianapolis Checkers in 1981, Melanson won the Ken McKenzie Trophy as rookie of the year of the Central Hockey League. Along with Billy Smith, Melanson won the William M. Jennings Trophy in the 1982–83 season, and he was also named to the NHL All-Star Second Team. He also won three consecutive Stanley Cups in 1981, 1982 and 1983.

Career statistics

Regular season and playoffs

References

External links

1960 births
Living people
Brantford Smoke players
Canadian ice hockey coaches
Canadian ice hockey goaltenders
Ice hockey people from New Brunswick
New Brunswick Sports Hall of Fame inductees
Indianapolis Checkers (CHL) players
Los Angeles Kings players
Minnesota North Stars players
Moncton Wildcats coaches
Montreal Canadiens coaches
Montreal Canadiens players
New Haven Nighthawks players
New Jersey Devils coaches
New Jersey Devils players
New York Islanders draft picks
New York Islanders players
Oshawa Generals players
Saint John Flames players
Sportspeople from Moncton
Stanley Cup champions
Utica Devils players
Vancouver Canucks coaches
William M. Jennings Trophy winners
Windsor Spitfires players